Momodou Lamin Jallow may refer to:

 J Hus (born 1995), British rapper, singer, and songwriter
 Momodou Lamin Jallow (soccer) (born 1996), Gambian-born American footballer